Johnson's Building may refer to:
 Johnson's Building, The Rocks, a heritage-listed building in Sydney, New South Wales, Australia
 Johnson's Building, Warwick, a heritage-listed building in Queensland, Australia